Navy Run is a  long 1st order tributary to Muddy Creek in Crawford County, Pennsylvania.  This is the only stream of this name in the United States.

Course
Navy Run rises about 0.25 miles southwest of Steuben Corners, Pennsylvania, and then flows north and northwest to join Muddy Creek about 2 miles southeast of Little Cooley, Pennsylvania.

Watershed
Navy Run drains  of area, receives about 45.2 in/year of precipitation, has a wetness index of 446.28, and is about 41% forested.

See also
 List of rivers of Pennsylvania

References

Rivers of Pennsylvania
Rivers of Crawford County, Pennsylvania